Edwin B. "Ted" Minden is a Canadian judge on the Ontario Superior Court of Justice. On the recommendation of then-Attorney General and Minister of Justice Allan Rock, Justice Minden was nominated for the court in 1996 by then-Prime Minister Jean Chrétien.

Education and early career

A native of Hamilton, Ontario, Justice Minden earned a B.A. from the University of Toronto, before completing his legal training at Osgoode Hall Law School in Toronto. He was called to the Bar of Ontario in 1978. Justice Minden was a criminal lawyer for almost twenty years before his appointment to the court.

Personal life
Justice Minden grew up in Hamilton and now lives in Toronto.

References

1952 births
Living people
Canadian lawyers
Judges in Ontario
Osgoode Hall Law School alumni
People from Hamilton, Ontario
University of Toronto alumni